Jade Sheena Jezebel Jagger (born 21 October 1971) is a British-French jewellery designer, home designer, and former model. She is the daughter of Rolling Stones lead singer Mick Jagger and 1970s fashion model and human rights advocate Bianca Jagger.

Early life
Jagger was born on 21 October 1971 at Belvedere Nursing Home in Paris, the only child of rock star Mick Jagger and his first wife, Bianca Jagger. Her parents divorced when she was a child. She is of English and Nicaraguan ancestry.

Jagger is the paternal half-sister of Karis Hunt Jagger (born 1970), Elizabeth Scarlett Jagger (born 1984), James Leroy Augustin Jagger (born 1985), Georgia May Ayeesha Jagger (born 1992), Gabriel Luke Beauregard Jagger (born 1997), Lucas Maurice Morad-Jagger (born 1999), and Deveraux Octavian Basil Jagger (born 2016).

Career
In 1996, Jagger launched Jade Inc., an integrated jewellery and fashion brand, and in 2001 she began working as the Creative Director for Garrard, an English company dealing in high-end jewellery. She worked there until 2006 and now promotes a lifestyle concept called "Jezebel" (her middle name), which fuses music, clothing, and lifestyle through original recordings, remixes, unplugged sessions, and fashion. She also has worked as a lingerie model. She has also designed apartments all over the world, including a tower of luxury residences called "Jade" in New York, and another in Mumbai.

In 2001 she appeared in Being Mick, a documentary chronicling a year in the life of her father.

In 2008 Jagger's career was revived, courtesy of Belvedere.

In 2009, Jagger was featured in an in-depth video clip for Observer Women's Magazine, sharing one of her creations, something she refers to as her "artwork", a "ribbon bracelet" which features some "easily available household things" such as; a "skull and wings", a tiny "palm tree, sort of reminds me of my home in Ibiza", a bunch of safety pins, "funky little bits and bobs", e.g. a little key trinket.

In 2011, Jagger was appointed for the designing of Lodha Group's Fiorenza project in Mumbai's Goregaon suburb. Blending India's rich and varied traditions with unique cultural elements from across the world, the development is expected to provide residents with the finest in fashionable living.

Personal life
While preparing for her A-Levels at Cambridge Centre for Sixth-form Studies in 1988, Jagger began a relationship with classmate Piers Jackson. She and Piers have two daughters, Assisi Lola Jackson (born 1992) and Amba Isis Jackson (born 1996). 

In 2004 Jagger began dating DJ Dan Williams. There were reports that they married in February 2009 but she has denied this and they separated in 2010.

Jagger married graphic designer/art director Adrian Fillary at Aynhoe Park, Northamptonshire, on 30 June 2012. They have a son, Ray Emmanuel Fillary (born 2014). 

Jagger became a grandmother on 19 May 2014, when her daughter Assisi gave birth to a daughter, Ezra Key. On 28 March 2019 Assisi gave birth to a second daughter, Romy Pearl Ciara Key.

References

External links
 
 Jade 16 West 19th Street, New York, NY (condo building)

 A plane designed by Jade Jagger. by Tendenciastv
 Jade Jagger for yoo
 Jagger Photos at Style.com

1971 births
British artists
British female models
British people of Australian descent
British people of Nicaraguan descent
British socialites
Jewellery designers
Living people
Mick Jagger
People educated at Bedales School
People educated at the Cambridge Centre for Sixth-form Studies
People educated at St Mary's School, Calne
People from Chelsea, London
Spence School alumni